Boris Boillon  was the French ambassador to Tunisia until 24 August 2012. Previously, he was ambassador to Iraq.

Early life
Arabic-speaker, Boris Boillon spent his childhood in Bejaia, where his father, an English professor, and his mother, a schoolteacher, were based in the 1960s and '70s.

Career

First Steps in Diplomacy
Boillon Boris graduated from the Institut d'Etudes Politiques de Paris and the Institut national des langues et civilisations orientales. After a mission to the sultanate of Oman in Muscat from 1993 to 1994, he was admitted to the competition for access to employment of foreign affairs advisor (East part) in 1998. He was then appointed editor of Foreign Policy and Security Service Joint Headquarters (1999–2001) and advisor to the French embassy in Algiers (2001–2004). Between August 2004 and April 2006, he was Consul-General Jerusalem as deputy special representative of the European Union for the peace process in the Middle East. Later, he was Special Adviser to the Ministry of Interior and Spatial Planning (mission to the European and International Affairs).

In January 2007, Boris Boillon became diplomatic adviser to the Minister of State and Minister of the Interior and Regional Planning Nicolas Sarkozy and retained this role under François Baroin, Minister Interior and Spatial Planning, until April of that year. Following the victory of Nicolas Sarkozy in the presidential election, Boris Boillon became "North Africa, Near and Middle East" advisor to the Presidency of the Republic.

With Claude Gueant, Boris Boillon worked on the issue of Bulgarian nurses held in Libya. He organized the visit to Paris in December 2007 Gaddafi whom he has often supported. Became ambassador, he says, and the end of 2010:

In his passage in Le Grand Journal in November 2010, he acknowledged that the supreme leader of Libya, Muammar Gaddafi, calls him "my son".

Ambassador to Iraq (2009–2011) 
Boris Boillon is officially appointed by the Council of Ministers ambassador of France in Iraq in July 2009. The ambassador, who is responsible among other things competing for contracts, and said the magazine Challenges

Supporting U.S. intervention in Iraq, Ambassador sees himself criticized for his comments by the researcher of the Institut de relations internationales et stratégiques Pascal Boniface.

Boillon defends his record:

In an interview with the Figaro in August 2010, Boris Boillon said:

Ambassador to Tunisia (2011–2012) 
On February 9, 2011  Boillon is appointed ambassador of France in Tunis instead of Pierre Ménat that the costs of errors of assessment by the French foreign policy at the Tunisian revolution.

Arrived in Tunis on February 16, he is responsible, according to the spokesperson of the Quai d'Orsay, "a new momentum, based on a new shared ambition" to renew ties between the people of Tunisia and France . His appointment does not, however, unanimously. Former ambassador Charles Crettien published an article in Le Monde to describe this choice as "shocking" or even "dangerous".

Shortly after taking office, Boillon invited Tunisian journalists to the embassy  but stirred controversy after he insulted them by dismissing a question about the handling of the Tunisian crisis by Michèle Alliot-Marie as "daft" and calling the journalists "morons" and "no one" before abruptly stopping the interview. Several hundred people  protest on Feb. 19 at the embassy, demanding his departure and denouncing his "lack of diplomacy" and his "aggressiveness". The same evening, he apologized on Tunisian national television to the journalists and to all Tunisians.

Often described as a wonder boy ambitious and proactive, is calling himself a Sarko product, its style is the subject various comments in the French press  and Tunisian who remind that ''one of the slogans of the "Jasmine Revolution" was "Dignity"

Trivia
He was appointed Knight of the Legion of Honour on December 31, 2010, thanks to his involvement in the HIV trial in Libya

He was arrested July 31, 2013 by a French Customs Officer at Paris, Gare Du Nord, holding €350,000 and $40,000 in cash while on his way to Brussels.

References

External links
 Official Biography

Ambassadors of France to Iraq
Ambassadors of France to Tunisia
Chevaliers of the Légion d'honneur
Living people
People from Pontarlier
Sciences Po alumni
Year of birth missing (living people)